The 1896 Home Nations Championship was the fourteenth series of the rugby union Home Nations Championship. Six matches were played between 4 January and 14 March. It was contested by England, Ireland, Scotland and Wales.

Table

Results

The matches

England vs. Wales

England S Haughton (Birkenhead Wanderers), S Morfitt (West Hartlepool), Ernest Fookes (Sowerby Bridge), EM Baker (Oxford Uni), James Valentine (Swinton), RHB Cattell (Moseley), EW Taylor (Rockcliff) capt., J Pinch (Lancaster), A Starks (Castleford), LF Giblin (Cambridge Uni), Frank Mitchell (Cambridge Uni), J Rhodes (Castleford), John William Ward (Castleford), GM Carey (Blackheath), W Whiteley (Bramley)

Wales Billy Bancroft (Swansea), Cliff Bowen (Llanelli), Owen Badger (Llanelli), Arthur Gould (Newport) capt., Bert Dauncey (Newport), David Morgan (Llanelli), Ben Davies (Llanelli), Albert Jenkin (Swansea), Arthur Boucher (Newport), Ernie George (Pontypridd), Sam Ramsey (Treorchy), Harry Packer (Newport), Charles Nicholl (Llanelli), Frank Mills (Cardiff), Wallace Watts (Newport)

Wales vs. Scotland

Wales Billy Bancroft (Swansea), Cliff Bowen (Llanelli), Gwyn Nicholls (Cardiff), Arthur Gould (Newport) capt., Bert Dauncey (Newport), Selwyn Biggs (Cardiff), Fred Parfitt (Newport), Jack Evans (Llanelli), William Cope (Blackheath), Barry Davies (Cardiff), Bill Morris (Llanelli), Harry Packer (Newport), Charles Nicholl (Llanelli), Fred Hutchinson (Neath), Dai Evans (Penygraig)

Scotland AR Smith (Oxford Uni), Alec Boswell Timms (Edinburgh Wanderers), GT Campbell (London Scottish), T Scott (Langholm), Robin Welsh (Watsonians), JW Simpson (Royal HSFP), WP Donaldson (West of Scotland), Andrew Balfour (Watsonians), JH Dods (London Scottish), D Patterson (Hawick), WMC McEwan (Edinburgh Acads), JH Couper (West of Scotland), GT Nielson (West of Scotland) capt., TM Scott (Hawick), HO Smith (Watsonians)

England vs. Ireland

England J. F. Byrne (Moseley), S Morfitt (West Hartlepool), Ernest Fookes (Sowerby Bridge), EM Baker (Oxford Uni), James Valentine (Swinton), RHB Cattell (Moseley), EW Taylor (Rockcliff) capt., J Pinch (Lancaster), A Starks (Castleford), LF Giblin (Cambridge Uni), Frank Mitchell (Cambridge Uni), J Rhodes (Castleford), John William Ward (Castleford), GM Carey (Blackheath), William Bromet (Richmond)

Ireland J Fulton (NIFC), W Gardiner (NIFC), S Lee (NIFC) capt., Lawrence Bulger (Dublin Uni.), TH Stevenson (Queen's Uni, Belfast), Louis Magee (Bective Rangers), GG Allen (Derry), JH O'Conor (Bective Rangers), JH Lytle (Lansdowne), WG Byron (NIFC), H Lindsay (Wanderers), Jim Sealy (Dublin Uni.), Thomas Crean (Wanderers), Andrew Clinch (Wanderers), CV Rooke (Monkstown)

Ireland vs. Scotland

Ireland GH McAllen (Dungannon), W Gardiner (NIFC), S Lee (NIFC) capt., Lawrence Bulger (Dublin Uni.), TH Stevenson (Queen's Uni, Belfast), Louis Magee (Bective Rangers), GG Allen (Derry), JH O'Conor (Bective Rangers), JH Lytle (Lansdowne), WG Byron (NIFC), H Lindsay (Wanderers), Jim Sealy (Dublin Uni.), Thomas Crean (Wanderers), Andrew Clinch (Wanderers), CV Rooke (Monkstown)

Scotland AR Smith (Oxford Uni), James Gowans (London Scottish), GT Campbell (London Scottish), CJN Fleming (Edinburgh Wanderers), W Neilson (London Scottish), JW Simpson (Royal HSFP), WP Donaldson (West of Scotland), Andrew Balfour (Watsonians), JH Dods (London Scottish), MC Morrison (Royal HSFP), WMC McEwan (Edinburgh Acads), JH Couper (West of Scotland), GT Nielson (West of Scotland) capt., GO Turnbull (West of Scotland), HO Smith (Watsonians)

Ireland vs. Wales

Ireland GH McAllen (Dungannon), W Gardiner (NIFC), S Lee (NIFC) capt., Lawrence Bulger (Dublin Uni.), TH Stevenson (Queen's Uni, Belfast), Louis Magee (Bective Rangers), GG Allen (Derry), JH O'Conor (Bective Rangers), JH Lytle (Lansdowne), WG Byron (NIFC), H Lindsay (Wanderers), Jim Sealy (Dublin Uni.), Thomas Crean (Wanderers), Andrew Clinch (Wanderers), CV Rooke (Monkstown)

Wales Billy Bancroft (Swansea), Cliff Bowen (Llanelli), Gwyn Nicholls (Cardiff), Arthur Gould (Newport) capt., Bert Dauncey (Newport), Llewellyn Lloyd (Newport), Fred Parfitt (Newport), Jack Evans (Llanelli), Arthur Boucher (Newport), Fred Miller (Mountain Ash), Bill Morris (Llanelli), Harry Packer (Newport), Charles Nicholl (Llanelli), Fred Hutchinson (Neath), Dai Evans (Penygraig)

Scotland vs. England

Scotland Gregor MacGregor  (London Scottish), James Gowans (London Scottish), GT Campbell (London Scottish), CJN Fleming (Edinburgh Wanderers), HTS Gedge (London Scottish), M Elliot (Hawick), WP Donaldson (West of Scotland), Andrew Balfour (Watsonians), JH Dods  (London Scottish), MC Morrison (Royal HSFP), WMC McEwan (Edinburgh Acads), TM Scott (Hawick), GT Nielson (West of Scotland) capt., GO Turnbull (West of Scotland), HO Smith (Watsonians)

England RW Poole (Hartlepool Rovers), S Morfitt (West Hartlepool), Ernest Fookes (Sowerby Bridge), EM Baker (Oxford Uni), James Valentine (Swinton), RHB Cattell (Moseley), Cyril Wells (Harlequins), JH Baron (Bingley), E Knowles (Millom), Harry Speed (Castleford), Frank Mitchell (Blackheath) capt., J Rhodes (Castleford), John William Ward (Castleford), GE Hughes (Barrow), T Broadley (Bingley)

External links

1895–96
1895–96 in British rugby union
1895–96 in English rugby union
rugby union
rugby union
Home Nations Championship
Home Nations Championship
Home Nations Championship
1895–96 in Scottish rugby union